Jamis Zaqut (Gaza Strip , December 6, 1965) is a Palestinian paralympic athlete.

Personal life
He has nine children. He was injured in 1992 after falling while working on a construction site in Israel, and has been using a wheelchair since then. From there he began his sports career. After receiving treatment for several years a rehabilitation center in Ramallah, by 2012 he was residing in a refugee camp in Khan Younis. Hacia 2012 residía en un campo de refugiados de Jan Yunis.

In 2011 he was the focus of a documentary produced by the British television channel Channel, which presented the Paralympic athletes of Gaza.

Sports career
He started practicing swimming and basketball (where he became captain of the Palestinian team), until he approached athletics. Currently trains in a park in the city of Gaza.

He participated in the 1998 world championship, finishing second in discus throwing, fourth in javelin throwing and fifth in shot put. He has participated in numerous Asian competitions.

London 2012

He participated in the 2012 Summer Paralympic Games in London ( United Kingdom ), where he was the flag bearer of the Palestinian delegation. Accessed the Games after qualifying in Doha, won in shot put with 10.77 meters, shortly after establishing an Asian record of 11.34.

Earlier in the qualifying events in Dubai ( UAE ) established a new world record in launching Paralympics weight (at a distance of 11.40 meters) and won five gold medals. For the London Games he continued his training in Qatar.

He competed in the throwing, discus and javelin events. His best result was obtained in the first event, being in fourth place with a throw of 11.30 meters.

See also
 Palestine at the Paralympics

References

1965 births
Living people
Palestinian male athletes
Athletes (track and field) at the 2012 Summer Paralympics